Johan Larsson may refer to:

 Johan Larsson (musician) (born 1974), Swedish bassist
 Johan Larsson (ice hockey, born 1986), Swedish ice hockey player
 Johan Larsson (ice hockey, born 1992), Swedish ice hockey player, drafted by the Minnesota Wild
 Johan Larsson (footballer) (born 1990), Swedish football player
 Johan Larsson i Örbyhus (1877-1947), Swedish ski manufacturer and politician